Namena Lala (sometimes spelt Namenalala) is a volcanic islet in Fiji, an outlier to the northern island of Vanua Levu (off Wainunu Bay),  away. The island is the site of the  Moody's Namenalala Island resort and nature reserve.

A  area of the island is the Namenalala Important Bird Area. It supports a population of vulnerable Shy Ground-dove. The sea bird nesting colony and beach forest of the island contribute to its national significance as outlined in Fiji's Biodiversity Strategy and Action Plan.

References

Islands of Fiji
Vanua Levu
Preliminary Register of Sites of National Significance in Fiji
Important Bird Areas of Fiji